Christopher Landau (born November 13, 1963) is an American lawyer and diplomat who served as the United States Ambassador to Mexico from 2019 to 2021. He was nominated to the position by President Donald Trump.

Early life and education 

Landau was born in Madrid, Spain, where his father, George (later United States Ambassador to Paraguay, Chile, and Venezuela), was then stationed with the Foreign Service.  He attended the American School of Asunción, Paraguay, for five years, where he learned his fluent Spanish.  He graduated from Groton School in Groton, Massachusetts, summa cum laude, in 1981.

He earned his Bachelor of Arts in history, summa cum laude, from Harvard College in 1985, where he was elected to Phi Beta Kappa his junior year, earned a Certificate in Latin American Studies, and received the Sophia Freund Prize for the highest grade point average in his graduating class.  He wrote his senior thesis, which was awarded the Hoopes Prize, on United States relations with the leftist government of Venezuela in the mid 1940s.  He received his Juris Doctor, magna cum laude, from Harvard Law School in 1989, where he was articles co-chair of the Harvard Law Review and won the Sears Prize for the highest grade point average in his second year.

Legal career 

After graduating from law school, Landau clerked for then-judge Clarence Thomas of the United States Court of Appeals for the District of Columbia Circuit. He later clerked for Justices Antonin Scalia and Clarence Thomas of the Supreme Court of the United States during the 1990 and 1991 Terms, respectively. During the former clerkship, Landau was co-clerk with Lawrence Lessig; during the latter clerkship, he was co-clerks with Gregory G. Katsas, Gregory E. Maggs and Stephen R. McAllister.

In 1993, Landau joined Kirkland & Ellis as an associate, becoming a partner in 1995. He was chairman of the firm's appellate practice until he left after 25 years to join Quinn Emanuel Urquhart & Sullivan in 2018.  He has argued nine cases before the U.S. Supreme Court, including two on behalf of the Commonwealth of Puerto Rico, and has briefed and argued appeals in all of the U.S. Courts of Appeals.

From 1994 to 1995, Landau was an adjunct professor of administrative law at the Georgetown University Law Center.  In 2017, the Chief Justice of the United States appointed him to the Advisory Committee on the Federal Rules of Appellate Procedure.  
Landau served as a Trustee of the United States Supreme Court Historical Society, and Chair of the Society's Programs Committee.
He was also a Director of the Diplomacy Center Foundation, which supports the United States Diplomacy Center at the United States Department of State.

United States Ambassador to Mexico 

On March 26, 2019, President Donald Trump nominated Landau as United States Ambassador to Mexico. On August 1, 2019, the Senate unanimously confirmed his nomination by voice vote. He was sworn into office on August 12, 2019, arrived in Mexico on August 16, 2019, and presented his credentials to President Andrés Manuel López Obrador on August 26, 2019. As Ambassador, Landau made the issue of immigration a top policy priority.

On September 9, 2020, President Trump added Landau to a list of potential nominees to the Supreme Court of the United States. After Joe Biden succeeded Trump as President, Landau left his post as ambassador in 2021, and was replaced by former U.S. Senator from Colorado Ken Salazar.

Social media usage 
As Ambassador to Mexico, Landau was noted for his heavy usage of social media. In 2020, he launched a challenge on Twitter to boost his follower count in order to exceed the 150,000 followers boasted by the U.S. Ambassador to Greece, noting his follower count was only 40,000 despite Mexico's much larger population. Landau tweeted in Spanish "This is an outrage! … Mexico has to be #1!" By July 2020, Landau's follower count had exploded to 245,000, in what Slate described as providing "an unexpected lesson in American digital diplomacy."

In September 2020, Landau was accused of cyberbullying a Mexican college student who criticized him on Twitter. Landau replied by sarcastically saying "Obviously, your great education and knowledge of the world would allow you to do diplomatic work much better than the ‘rudimentary’ communications of this ‘white foreigner.' The student reportedly closed their account on Twitter following the exchange.

See also 
 List of ambassadors of the United States to Mexico
 List of law clerks of the Supreme Court of the United States (Seat 9)
 List of law clerks of the Supreme Court of the United States (Seat 10)
 Donald Trump Supreme Court candidates

References

External links 
 Appearances at the U.S. Supreme Court from the Oyez Project

1963 births
Living people
20th-century American lawyers
21st-century American lawyers
Ambassadors of the United States to Mexico
Georgetown University Law Center faculty
Harvard College alumni
Harvard Law School alumni
People associated with Kirkland & Ellis
Law clerks of the Supreme Court of the United States
Lawyers from Washington, D.C.
Maryland lawyers
Maryland Republicans
People from Madrid
Quinn Emanuel Urquhart & Sullivan people
Trump administration personnel
Groton School alumni